"Subterranean Homesick Blues" is a song by Bob Dylan, recorded on January 14, 1965, and released as a single by Columbia Records, catalogue number 43242, on March 8. It was the lead track on the album Bringing It All Back Home, released some two weeks later. It was Dylan's first Top 40 hit in the United States, peaking at number 39 on the Billboard Hot 100. It also entered the Top 10 of the UK Singles Chart. The song has subsequently been reissued on numerous compilations, the first being the 1967 singles compilation Bob Dylan's Greatest Hits. One of Dylan's first electric recordings, "Subterranean Homesick Blues" is also notable for its innovative music video, which first appeared in D. A. Pennebaker's documentary Dont Look Back.  An acoustic version of the song, recorded the day before the single, was released on The Bootleg Series Volumes 1–3 (Rare & Unreleased) 1961–1991.

It is ranked 187th on Rolling Stone's 500 Greatest Songs of All Time list.  In its contemporary review, Cash Box described it as a "rockin’-country folk blueser with a solid beat and catchy lyrics" and "wild" guitar and harmonica playing.

References and allusions
"Subterranean Homesick Blues" is an amalgam of Jack Kerouac, the Woody Guthrie–Pete Seeger song "Taking It Easy" ("Mom was in the kitchen preparing to eat / Sis was in the pantry looking for some yeast") and the rock and roll poetry of Chuck Berry's "Too Much Monkey Business".

In 2004, Dylan said, "It's from Chuck Berry, a bit of 'Too Much Monkey Business' and some of the scat songs of the '40s."

Dylan has also stated that when he attended the University of Minnesota in 1959, he fell under the influence of the Beat scene: "It was Jack Kerouac, Ginsberg, Corso and Ferlinghetti." Kerouac's The Subterraneans, a novel published in 1958 about the Beats, has been suggested as a possible inspiration for the song's title.

The song's first line is a reference to codeine distillation and the politics of the time: "Johnny's in the basement mixing up the medicine / I'm on the pavement thinkin' about the government". The song also depicts some of the growing conflicts between "straights" or "squares" and the emerging counterculture of the 1960s. The widespread use of recreational drugs and turmoil surrounding the Vietnam War were both starting to take hold of the nation, and Dylan's hyperkinetic lyrics were dense with up-to-the-minute allusions to important emerging elements in the 1960s youth culture. According to rock journalist Andy Gill, "an entire generation recognized the zeitgeist in the verbal whirlwind of 'Subterranean Homesick Blues'."

The song also refers to the struggles surrounding the American civil rights movement ("Better stay away from those / That carry 'round a fire hose"—during the civil rights movement, peaceful protestors were beaten and sprayed with high-pressure fire hoses). The song was Dylan's first Top 40 hit in the United States.

Influence
"Subterranean Homesick Blues" has had a wide influence, resulting in iconic references by artists and non-artists alike. (Most infamously, its lyric "you don't need a weatherman to know which way the wind blows" was the inspiration for the name of the American far-left organization known as the Weather Underground, which formed after breaking away from the Students for a Democratic Society.) In a 2007 study of legal opinions and briefs that found Dylan was quoted by judges and lawyers more than any other songwriter, "you don't need a weatherman..." was distinguished as the line most often cited.

John Lennon was reported to find the song so captivating that he did not know how he would be able to write a song that could compete with it. The group Firehose (former members of Minutemen) took its name from another of the song's enigmatic warnings: "Better stay away from those that carry around a fire hose..." In addition, the opening of the last verse, "Ah get born, keep warm", provided the Australian garage rock band Jet with the title of their debut album Get Born.

In the same way that Dylan paid homage to Jack Kerouac's novel, The Subterraneans, "Subterranean Homesick Blues" has been referenced in the titles of various songs, for example, Radiohead's "Subterranean Homesick Alien" from the 1997 album OK Computer; the ska punk band Mustard Plug's "Suburban Homesick Blues" from the 1997 album Evildoers Beware; the Memphis indie band The Grifters' "Subterranean Death Ride Blues", the B-side of a 1996 single; and the British folk rock band Deaf Havana's "Subterranean Bullshit Blues" from the 2013 album Old Souls. It was also the basis for the title of the second episode of Law & Orders premiere season, "Subterranean Homeboy Blues".

In the 1980s sitcom Murphy Brown, a flashback sequence shows Brown (Candice Bergen) and her future coworker Frank Fontana (Joe Regalbuto) meeting for the first time in a bar. In order to prove to one another their genuine counterculture credentials from the mid-1960s, they join in a "challenge duet" of the first verse of "Subterranean Homesick Blues".

Speaking to WatchMojo.com in 2011, Ed Sheeran compared Eminem to Dylan, proclaiming: "You might look at [them] and say they're two totally different acts, but all you have to do with Eminem is put a guitar behind his words and it's a very similar thing. Folk music tells stories and hip hop tells stories, there's just a beat that separates it. [...] Bob Dylan [raps] his tunes, if you listen to [Subterranean Homesick Blues], that's not a million miles away from an Eminem tune″.

Versions

Covers of the song span a range of styles, including those by the reggae musician Gregory Isaacs on Is It Rolling Bob?, his 2004 album of Dylan songs, with Toots Hibbert; the bluegrass musician Tim O'Brien on his 1996 album of Dylan covers, Red on Blonde; the rock band Red Hot Chili Peppers on the 1987 album The Uplift Mofo Party Plan; the Cajun-style fiddle player Doug Kershaw on Louisiana Man in 1978; and the singer-songwriter Harry Nilsson on his 1974 album Pussy Cats, produced by John Lennon, who admired the song. The song was also covered by Alanis Morissette when she stood in for Dylan at his 2005 induction into the UK Music Hall of Fame. In addition, Robert Wyatt's "Blues in Bob Minor", on his 1997 album Shleep, uses the song's rhythm as a structural template. 

In December 2009, the rapper Juelz Santana released the single "Mixin' Up the Medicine", which features lyrics in the chorus, performed by alternative rapper Yelawolf, and maintains some of the song's original acoustics. Ed Volker of the New Orleans Radiators also has performed the song in his solo shows and with the Radiators, often paired with "Highway 61 Revisited".

In 1985, British actor Tom Watt, at the time enjoying a high profile playing the role of Lofty Holloway in EastEnders, released a version of the song that made number 67 in the UK singles chart.

Allusions in other artists' songs

Elvis Costello cited "Subterranean Homesick Blues" as inspiration for his 1978 song "Pump It Up" saying, "It's how rock and roll works. You take the broken pieces of another thrill and make a brand new toy. That's what I did."

Echo & the Bunnymen's 1980 song "Villiers Terrace" includes the lyric "There's people rolling 'round on the carpet / Mixin' up the medicine."

R.E.M.'s 1987 hit, "It's the End of the World as We Know It (And I Feel Fine)", has been stated by guitarist Peter Buck to be an homage to the song.

The Hayes Carll track "KMAG YOYO" is a direct homage to the rhythms and subject matter of "Subterranean Homesick Blues".

The Jesus and Mary Chain's 1989 single "Blues from a Gun" includes the lyric "Look out kid, you're gonna get hit", a line borrowed from the Dylan track.

Radiohead's song "Subterranean Homesick Alien", from their 1997 album OK Computer, pays homage by referencing Bob Dylan's track in the title.

Robert Wyatt's song "Blues in Bob Minor" from his 1997 album Shleep includes the line, "Genuflecting, bowing deeply/It don't take a weathergirl to see/Where the wind is blowing/What the wind is bending."

The Gaslight Anthem's song "Angry Johnny and the Radio", from their 2007 album Sink or Swim, includes the lyrics "And I'm still here singin', thinking about the government" and "Are you hidin' in a basement, mixin' up the medicine?"

Beastie Boys' song "Funky Donkey" from their 2011 album Hot Sauce Committee Part Two contains the lyrics "I don't wear Crocs and I don't wear sandals / The pump don't work 'cause the vandals took the handle."

Deaf Havana's album Old Souls contains the song "Subterranean Bullshit Blues", which references the title in homage to the songwriter James Veck-Gilodi's respect for Dylan.

Adam Green's song "Novotel" includes the lyric "Novotel / The phone's tapped anyway."

Promotional film clip

In addition to its influence on music, the song was used in one of the first "modern" promotional film clips, the forerunner of what was later known as the music video. Rolling Stone ranked it seventh in the magazine's October 1993 list of "100 Top Music Videos". The original clip was the opening segment of D. A. Pennebaker's film Dont Look Back, a documentary on Dylan's 1965 tour of England. In the film, Dylan, who came up with the idea, holds up cue cards with selected words and phrases from the lyrics. The cue cards were written by Donovan, Allen Ginsberg, Bob Neuwirth and Dylan himself. 

While staring at the camera, Dylan flips the cards as the song plays. There are intentional misspellings and puns throughout the clip: for instance, when the song's lyrics say "eleven dollar bills", the poster says "20 dollar bills". The clip was shot in an alley close to the Savoy Hotel in London. Ginsberg is constantly visible in the background, talking to Neuwirth. For use as a trailer, the following text was superimposed at the end of the clip, Dylan and Ginsberg are exiting the frame: "SURFACING HERE SOON | BOB DYLAN IN | DONT LOOK BACK By D. A. PENNEBAKER". The Savoy Hotel has retained much of its exterior as it was in 1965, and the alley used in the film has been identified as the Savoy Steps.

In addition to the Savoy Hotel clip, two alternate promotional films were shot: one in a park (Embankment Gardens, adjacent to the Savoy Hotel) where Dylan, Neuwirth and Ginsberg are joined by Dylan's producer, Tom Wilson, and another shot on the roof of an unknown building (actually the Savoy Hotel). A montage of the clips can be seen in the documentary No Direction Home.

The film clip was used in September 2010 in a promotional video to launch Google Instant. As they are typed, the lyrics of the song generate search engine results pages.

The 1992 Tim Robbins film Bob Roberts features Robbins in the title role as a right-wing folk singer who uses Dylan's cue-card concept for the song "Wall Street Rap". In "Weird Al" Yankovic's music video for the 2003 song "Bob" (a series of 38 palindromic sentences which parody Dylan's music and writing style. The word "Bob" is itself a palindrome), Yankovic mimics Dylan's video by dressing as Dylan and dropping cue cards that have the song's lyrics on them.

References

External links
 
Something is happening. Bob Dylan 1965 on Björner.com

1965 singles
1965 songs
Alanis Morissette songs
Bob Dylan songs
Columbia Records singles
Harry Nilsson songs
List songs
Patter songs
Red Hot Chili Peppers songs
Song recordings produced by Tom Wilson (record producer)
Songs written by Bob Dylan